2014 Heart of Dallas Bowl can refer to:

 2014 Heart of Dallas Bowl (January), played as part of the 2013–14 college football bowl season between the North Texas Mean Green and the UNLV Rebels
 2014 Heart of Dallas Bowl (December), played as part of the 2014–15 college football bowl season between the Louisiana Tech Bulldogs and the Illinois Fighting Illini